Rampur Karkhana is a constituency of the Uttar Pradesh Legislative Assembly covering the city of Rampur Karkhana in the Deoria district of Uttar Pradesh, India.

Rampur Karkhana is one of five assembly constituencies in the Deoria Lok Sabha constituency. Since 2008, this assembly constituency is numbered 339 amongst 403 constituencies.

Election results

2022

2017
Bharatiya Janta Party candidate Kamlesh Shukla won in last Assembly election of 2017 Uttar Pradesh Legislative Elections defeating Samajwadi Party candidate Fasiha Manzer Ghazala Lari by a margin of 9,987 votes.

Members of Legislative Assembly

References

External links
 

Assembly constituencies of Uttar Pradesh
Deoria district